Luis Carlos Ramos Lobo Filho (born 11 February 1999), commonly known as Luca Lobo, is a Brazilian footballer who plays as a defender.

References

External links
 

1999 births
Living people
Association football defenders
Brazilian footballers
Brazilian expatriate footballers
FC Tulsa players
USL Championship players